Kim Cameron (born November 28, 1966) is an American recording artist and author from Miami, FL. Her electronic dance music incorporates elements of rock, pop, R&B, and jazz.

Early life
Kim MacGregor Cameron was born in Eau Claire, Wisconsin on November 28, 1966. Her father, Paul Cameron, was a professor of Psychology, and her mother, Virginia Cameron, was a teacher. She has an older brother, Kirk and a younger sister Karyn. She began her music education in St. Mary's, Maryland, where she learned to play clarinet at the age of six. She went on to perform in several marching bands after she moved to Thousand Oaks, California, where she also performed as the lead actor in the musical The Pirates of Penzance.

After several lead roles in musicals and plays such as Grease, Li'l Abner, and King David, she was selected for the choral group Singers, as well as the Indian Hills Choir in Lincoln, Nebraska. At the same time, she finished first in the state in the Nebraska for Poetry Interpretation at the Nebraska State's Speech competition and fourth in the nation.

She attended the University of Nebraska–Lincoln for three years, completing her broadcasting major courses before finishing internship in broadcast journalism and her Bachelor of Arts degree in Journalism degree at Wichita State University in 1988.

Early career
Cameron began her broadcast career as a radio personality at KHAT-FM, in Lincoln, Nebraska. A year later, she took an internship at KAKE-TV in Wichita, Kansas. She moved to the east coast and began a corporate career developing training and promotional videos for information technology companies. She worked at MCI, as the National Training Manager for several years before moving to Siebel Systems as a Practice Manager.

In the early 1990s, Cameron began performing in a local cover band in Washington, D.C. After 10 years of working the D.C. clubs, the band took a break after the father of one of the band members was murdered.

In 2007, Cameron left her work as a corporate executive to pursue a full-time career in music. She wrote her first song, "Never Forget", about her brother-in-law. After attempting to produce her own album in 2007, she was introduced to Marco Delmar from Recording Arts.  The album, Contradictions, was re-produced by Delmar and released September 2008.

Billboard success
Cameron secured placement for three months on American Airlines's inflight entertainment. With one of her songs written about a military man she met on a plane, she became known within the American military community, and her songs were granted airtime on Great Americans, Hooah Radio, Mil Bloggers, VA News and the Pentagon Channel.

Cameron signed a short one-year contract with Realize Records.  She released her second album Turning Point in 2010 using both Marco Delmar and Robert Jazayeri as producers. The album had some charting success on adult album alternative and College Music Journal radio stations. She self-financed her first tour, which took her through 20 states in 2010. She received a not-so-favorable article in Smart Money, but later garnered positive performance reviews from music trade publications.

In November 2010, she terminated her relationship with Realize Records and continued to self-publish her original songs.  She released her first from her upcoming third album ‘The Blond Side’in September 2010, called 'Sexy Smile'. This was Cameron's first foray into commercial radio, and she hit No. 103 on Mediabase in November, staying on the charts for seven weeks.  In November 2010, she released her first Christmas original 'My Memories of Christmas' which was aired by 30 Top 40 commercial stations in the first week.

Cameron released 'A Dance' in January 2011, which hit No. 31 on Billboard's Adult Top 40 in May 2011.  She released 'Paradise'  for the Adult Contemporary genre in February 2011.  Cameron hit No. 31 on that chart, and stayed on it for 16 weeks.

In January 2012, Cameron released a music video ‘3 Seconds’ via Youtube which garnered over 1 million views in less than two months.  In March 2012, she was signed to Huber Entertainment-based out of Minneapolis, Minnesota. The fourth album, Spin Me Ever After was released. The music video for "Man I Used to Know" received over 2.4 millions YouTube views in just weeks. The year was finished with an international tour and the Universal Conquest Award for Album of the Year.

In 2013, Cameron's live performance concert was placed on Comcast Xfinity onDemand in the Washington, DC metro market, New England, and Northern California. It was also placed on Time Warner's Staten Island cable network.

In July, producer/remixer Mike Rizzo remixed the single 'Not into You'.

By 2014, the newest single 'Now You're Mine,' had become Cameron's second Top 20 Billboard hit.

Continuing with the success of the single, on 11/12/13, 'Now You're Mine' made its way to No. 1 on King of Spins.

In 2014, Cameron released her next hit called 'Let's Fall in Love'.

Author
Since 2013, Cameron has written three children's books as part of the Seaper Powers series. The books are available in hard copy, eBook, and Audio book (including original scoring).  Cameron continues to travel across the country as part of the series' national book tour/puppet show.

Seaper Powers book series:
In Search of Bleu Jay's Treasure
The Mystery of the Blue Pearls
The Rescue
The Riddle

Awards
2018 Winner American Songwriting Award (Dancing in the Dark)
2018 Global Music Awards – Silver Medal (Share My Pillow)
2018 Madrid Film Awards Selected for Best Cinematography (Spin Me Ever After)
2018 Best Recording Indie Music Channel (Dancing in the Dark Bimbo Jones Remix)
2018 Clouzine Best Dance Song (Dancing in the Dark
2018 International Independent Film Awards Silver Winner (Dancing in the Dark)
2017 Best Music Video – Wanna Go Switzerland International Film Festival
2017 Silver Medal Best Dance Song 'Moon on the Water'
2016 Top 20 Chart 'Moon on the Water'
2016 'But You' on the Mediabase Top 30 chart
2012 Universal Conquest Award – Album of the Year, Spin Me Ever After
2011 named in the top 100 live unsigned acts in the nation by Music Connection magazine

Discography

Albums
Contradictions Album (2008)
Turning Point Album (2010)
The Blond Side (2011) Produced by Richie Cannata of JLo and Billy Joel
Spin Me Ever After (2012)
Still Spinning (2013)
No Regrets (2015)
Naturally Yours (2016)
Entwined (2017)
Greatest Hits (2018)
Connecting to Animals album (2020)
Seaper Powers The Movie Soundtrack (2020)
Carpe Musicam (2019/2020) 
All Love (2021–2022)

Singles
Let's Fall in Love (2014)
Now You're Mine (2014)
Didn't Know I was Fallin (2019)
Fearless Lovers (2018) 
Share My Pillow (2018)
Tip Toe (2020)
Simply Naked (2019)
Take Me Back (2018) 
Tighter (2019)

References

Musicians from Wisconsin
People from Eau Claire, Wisconsin
1966 births
Living people
21st-century American women singers
21st-century American singers